Həjo (also, known as Gazho) is a village in the Astara Rayon of Azerbaijan.

References 

Populated places in Astara District